Ukrainian is an East Slavic language of the Indo-European language family, spoken primarily in Ukraine. It is the native language of Ukrainians.

Written Ukrainian uses the Ukrainian alphabet, a variant of the Cyrillic script. The standard Ukrainian language is regulated by the National Academy of Sciences of Ukraine (NANU; particularly by its Institute for the Ukrainian Language), the Ukrainian language-information fund, and Potebnia Institute of Linguistics. Comparisons are often drawn to Russian, another East Slavic language, but there is more mutual intelligibility with Belarusian.

Ukrainian is a descendent of Old East Slavic, a language spoken in the medieval state of Kievan Rus'. In the Grand Duchy of Lithuania, the language developed into Ruthenian, where it became an official language, before a process of Polonization began in the Polish–Lithuanian Commonwealth. By the 18th century, Ruthenian diverged into regional variants and the modern Ukrainian language developed in the territory of present-day Ukraine. Russification saw the Ukrainian language banned as a subject from schools and as a language of instruction in the Russian Empire, and continued in various ways in the Soviet Union. However, through folk songs, itinerant musicians, and prominent authors, the language maintained a strong base in Western Ukraine.

Linguistic development

Theories
Specifically Ukrainian developments that led to a gradual change of the Old East Slavic vowel system into the system found in modern Ukrainian began approximately in the 12th/13th century (that is, still at the time of the Kievan Rus') with a lengthening and raising of the Old East Slavic mid vowels e and o when followed by a consonant and a weak yer vowel that would eventually disappear completely, for example Old East Slavic котъ /kɔtə/ > Ukrainian кіт /kit/ 'cat' (via transitional stages such as /koˑtə̆/, /kuˑt(ə̆)/, /kyˑt/ or similar) or Old East Slavic печь /pʲɛtʃʲə/ > Ukrainian піч /pitʃ/ 'oven' (via transitional stages such as /pʲeˑtʃʲə̆/, /pʲiˑtʃʲ/ or similar). This raising and other phonological developments of the time, such as the merger of the Old East Slavic vowel phonemes и /i/ and ы /ɨ/ into the specifically Ukrainian phoneme /ɪ ~ e/, spelled with и (in the 13th/14th centuries), and the fricativisation of the Old East Slavic consonant г /g/, probably first to /ɣ/ (in the 13th century), with the result /ɦ/ in Modern Ukrainian, never happened in Russian, and only the fricativisation of Old East Slavic г /g/ occurred in Belarusian, where the result is /ɣ/.

The first theory of the origin of the Ukrainian language was suggested in Imperial Russia in the middle of the 18th century by Mikhail Lomonosov. This theory posits the existence of a common language spoken by all East Slavic people in the time of the Rus'. According to Lomonosov, the differences that subsequently developed between Great Russian and Ukrainian (which he referred to as Little Russian) could be explained by the influence of the Polish and Slovak languages on Ukrainian and the influence of Uralic languages on Russian from the 13th to the 17th centuries.

Another point of view was developed during the 19th and 20th centuries by other linguists of Imperial Russia and the Soviet Union. Like Lomonosov, they assumed the existence of a common language spoken by East Slavs in the past. But unlike Lomonosov's hypothesis, this theory does not view "Polonization" or any other external influence as the main driving force that led to the formation of three different languages (Russian, Ukrainian and Belarusian) from the common Old East Slavic language. The supporters of this theory disagree, however, about the time when the different languages were formed.

Soviet scholars set the divergence between Ukrainian and Russian only at later time periods (14th through 16th centuries). According to this view, Old East Slavic diverged into Belarusian and Ukrainian to the west (collectively, the Ruthenian language of the 15th to 18th centuries), and Old East Slavic to the north-east, after the political boundaries of the Kievan Rus' were redrawn in the 14th century.

Some researchers, while admitting the differences between the dialects spoken by East Slavic tribes in the 10th and 11th centuries, still consider them as "regional manifestations of a common language".

In contrast, Ahatanhel Krymsky and Aleksey Shakhmatov assumed the existence of the common spoken language of Eastern Slavs only in prehistoric times. According to their point of view, the diversification of the Old East Slavic language took place in the 8th or early 9th century.

Russian linguist Andrey Zaliznyak stated that the Old Novgorod dialect differed significantly from that of other dialects of Kievan Rus' during the 11th–12th century, but  
started becoming more similar to them around 13th–15th centuries. The modern Russian language hence developed from the fusion of this Novgorod dialect and the common dialect spoken by the other Kievan Rus', whereas the modern Ukrainian and Belarusian languages developed from the dialects which did not differ from each other in a significant way.

Some Ukrainian features were recognizable in the southern dialects of Old East Slavic as far back as the language can be documented.

Ukrainian linguist Stepan Smal-Stotsky denies the existence of a common Old East Slavic language at any time in the past. Similar points of view were shared by Yevhen Tymchenko, Vsevolod Hantsov, Olena Kurylo, Ivan Ohienko and others. According to this theory, the dialects of East Slavic tribes evolved gradually from the common Proto-Slavic language without any intermediate stages during the 6th through 9th centuries. The Ukrainian language was formed by convergence of tribal dialects, mostly due to an intensive migration of the population within the territory of today's Ukraine in later historical periods. This point of view was also supported by George Shevelov's phonological studies.

Origins and developments during medieval times

As a result of close Slavic contacts with the remnants of the Scythian and Sarmatian population north of the Black Sea, lasting into the early Middle Ages, the appearance of the voiced fricative γ/г (romanized "h"), in modern Ukrainian and some southern Russian dialects is explained by the assumption that it initially emerged in Scythian and related eastern Iranian dialects, from earlier common Proto-Indo-European *g and *gʰ.

During the 13th century, when German settlers were invited to Ukraine by the princes of the Kingdom of Ruthenia, German words began to appear in the language spoken in Ukraine. Their influence would continue under Poland not only through German colonists but also through the Yiddish-speaking Jews. Often such words involve trade or handicrafts. Examples of words of German or Yiddish origin spoken in Ukraine include dakh (roof), rura (pipe), rynok (market), kushnir (furrier), and majster (master or craftsman).

Developments under Poland and Lithuania
In the 13th century, eastern parts of Rus (including Moscow) came under Tatar rule until their unification under the Tsardom of Muscovy, whereas the south-western areas (including Kyiv) were incorporated into the Grand Duchy of Lithuania. For the following four centuries, the languages of the two regions evolved in relative isolation from each other. Direct written evidence of the existence of the Ukrainian language dates to the late 16th century. By the 16th century, a peculiar official language formed: a mixture of  the liturgical standardised language of Old Church Slavonic, Ruthenian and Polish. The influence of the latter gradually increased relative to the former two, as the nobility and rural large-landowning class, known as the szlachta, was largely Polish-speaking. Documents soon took on many Polish characteristics superimposed on Ruthenian phonetics. 

Polish rule and education also involved significant exposure to the Latin language. Much of the influence of Poland on the development of the Ukrainian language has been attributed to this period and is reflected in multiple words and constructions used in everyday Ukrainian speech that were taken from Polish or Latin. Examples of Polish words adopted from this period include zavzhdy (always; taken from old Polish word zawżdy) and obitsiaty (to promise; taken from Polish obiecać) and from Latin (via Polish) raptom (suddenly) and meta (aim or goal).

Significant contact with Tatars and Turks resulted in many Turkic words, particularly those involving military matters and steppe industry, being adopted into the Ukrainian language.  Examples include torba (bag) and tyutyun (tobacco).

Due to heavy borrowings from Polish, German, Czech and Latin, early modern vernacular Ukrainian (prosta mova, "simple speech") had more lexical similarity with West Slavic languages than with Russian or Church Slavonic. By the mid-17th century, the linguistic divergence between the Ukrainian and Russian languages had become so significant that there was a need for translators during negotiations for the Treaty of Pereyaslav, between Bohdan Khmelnytsky, head of the Zaporozhian Host, and the Russian state.

By the 18th century, Ruthenian had diverged into regional variants, developing into the modern Belarusian, Rusyn, and Ukrainian languages.

Chronology
The accepted chronology of Ukrainian divides the language into Old, Middle, and Modern Ukrainian. George Shevelov explains that much of this is based on the character of contemporary written sources, ultimately reflecting socio-historical developments, and he further subdivides the MU period with Early and Late phases.

 Proto-Ukrainian (abbreviated PU, Ukrainian: , until the mid-11th century), with no extant written sources by speakers in Ukraine. Corresponding to aspects of Old East Slavic.
Part of broader Old East Slavic.
 Early Middle Ukrainian (EMU, 15th to mid-16th c., 1387–1575), analysis focuses on distinguishing Ukrainian and Belarusian texts.
 Middle Ukrainian (MU, mid-16th to early 18th c., 1575–1720), represented by several vernacular language varieties as well as a version of Church Slavic.
 Late Middle Ukrainian (LMU, rest of the 18th c., 1720–1818), found in many mixed Ukrainian–Russian and Russian–Ukrainian texts.

Ukraine annually marks the Day of Ukrainian Writing and Language on November 9, the Eastern Orthodox feast day of Nestor the Chronicler.

History of the spoken language

Rus and Kingdom of Ruthenia
During the Khazar period, the territory of Ukraine was settled by Iranian (post-Scythian), Turkic (post-Hunnic, proto-Bulgarian), and Uralic (proto-Hungarian) tribes and Slavic tribes. Later, the Varangian ruler Oleg of Novgorod would seize Kyiv and establish the political entity of Kievan Rus'.

The era of Kyivan Rus is the subject of some linguistic controversy, as the language of much of the literature was purely or heavily Old Church Slavonic. Literary records from Kyivan Rus testify to substantial difference between Russian and Ruthenian form of the Ukrainian language as early as Kyivan Rus time.

Some theorists see an early Ukrainian stage in language development here, calling it Old Ruthenian; others term this era Old East Slavic. Russian theorists tend to amalgamate Rus to the modern nation of Russia, and call this linguistic era Old Russian. However, according to Russian linguist Andrey Zaliznyak, Novgorod people did not call themselves Rus until the 14th century, calling Rus only Kyiv, Pereiaslav and Chernihiv principalities (the Kyivan Rus state existed till 1240). At the same time as evidenced by the contemporary chronicles, the ruling princes of Kingdom of Ruthenia and Kyiv called themselves "People of Rus" – Ruthenians, and Galicia–Volhynia was called the Kingdom of Ruthenia.

Also according to Andrey Zaliznyak, the Novgorod dialect differed significantly from that of other dialects of Kyivan Rus during the 11th–12th century, but  
started becoming more similar to them around 13th–15th centuries. The modern Russian language hence developed from the fusion of this Novgorod dialect and the common dialect spoken by the other Kyivan Rus, whereas the modern Ukrainian and Belarusian languages developed from the dialects which did not differ from each other in a significant way.

Under Lithuania/Poland, Muscovy/Russia and Austro-Hungary

After the fall of Kingdom of Ruthenia, Ukrainians mainly fell under the rule of Lithuania and then Poland. Local autonomy of both rule and language was a marked feature of Lithuanian rule. In the Grand Duchy of Lithuania, Old East Slavic became the language of the chancellery and gradually evolved into the Ruthenian language. Polish rule, which came later, was accompanied by a more assimilationist policy. By the 1569 Union of Lublin that formed the Polish–Lithuanian Commonwealth, a significant part of Ukrainian territory was moved from Lithuanian rule to Polish administration, resulting in cultural Polonization and visible attempts to colonize Ukraine by the Polish nobility.

Many Ukrainian nobles were forced to learn the Polish language and convert to Catholicism during that period in order to maintain their lofty aristocratic position. Lower classes were less affected because literacy was common only in the upper class and clergy. The latter were also under significant Polish pressure after the Union with the Catholic Church. Most of the educational system was gradually Polonized. In Ruthenia, the language of administrative documents gradually shifted towards Polish.

The Polish language has had heavy influences on Ukrainian (particularly in Western Ukraine). The southwestern Ukrainian dialects are transitional to Polish. As the Ukrainian language developed further, some borrowings from Tatar and Turkish occurred. Ukrainian culture and language flourished in the sixteenth and first half of the 17th century, when Ukraine was part of the Polish–Lithuanian Commonwealth, albeit in spite of being part of the PLC, not as a result. Among many schools established in that time, the Kyiv-Mohyla Collegium (the predecessor of the modern Kyiv-Mohyla Academy), founded by the Moldavian Orthodox Metropolitan Peter Mogila, was the most important. At that time languages were associated more with religions: Catholics spoke Polish, and members of the Orthodox church spoke Ruthenian.

After the Treaty of Pereyaslav, Ukrainian high culture went into a long period of steady decline. In the aftermath, the Kyiv-Mohyla Academy was taken over by the Russian Empire and closed down later in the 19th century. Most of the remaining Ukrainian schools also switched to Polish or Russian in the territories controlled by these respective countries, which was followed by a new wave of Polonization and Russification of the native nobility. Gradually the official language of Ukrainian provinces under Poland was changed to Polish, while the upper classes in the Russian part of Ukraine used Russian.

During the 19th century, a revival of Ukrainian self-identification manifested in the literary classes of both Russian-Empire Dnieper Ukraine and Austrian Galicia. The Brotherhood of Sts Cyril and Methodius in Kyiv applied an old word for the Cossack motherland, Ukrajina, as a self-appellation for the nation of Ukrainians, and Ukrajins'ka mova for the language. Many writers published works in the Romantic tradition of Europe demonstrating that Ukrainian was not merely a language of the village but suitable for literary pursuits.

However, in the Russian Empire expressions of Ukrainian culture and especially language were repeatedly persecuted for fear that a self-aware Ukrainian nation would threaten the unity of the empire. In 1804 Ukrainian as a subject and language of instruction was banned from schools. In 1811 by the Order of the Russian government, the Kyiv-Mohyla Academy was closed. The academy had been open since 1632 and was the first university in Eastern Europe. 

In 1847 the Brotherhood of Sts Cyril and Methodius was terminated. The same year Taras Shevchenko was arrested, exiled for ten years, and banned for political reasons from writing and painting. In 1862 Pavlo Chubynsky was exiled for seven years to Arkhangelsk. The Ukrainian magazine Osnova was discontinued. In 1863, the tsarist interior minister Pyotr Valuyev proclaimed in his decree that "there never has been, is not, and never can be a separate Little Russian language". 

A following ban on Ukrainian books led to Alexander II's secret Ems Ukaz, which prohibited publication and importation of most Ukrainian-language books, public performances and lectures, and even banned the printing of Ukrainian texts accompanying musical scores. A period of leniency after 1905 was followed by another strict ban in 1914, which also affected Russian-occupied Galicia.

For much of the 19th century the Austrian authorities demonstrated some preference for Polish culture, but the Ukrainians were relatively free to partake in their own cultural pursuits in Halychyna and Bukovina, where Ukrainian was widely used in education and official documents. The suppression by Russia hampered the literary development of the Ukrainian language in Dnipro Ukraine, but there was a constant exchange with Halychyna, and many works were published under Austria and smuggled to the east.

By the time of the Russian Revolution of 1917 and the collapse of Austro-Hungary in 1918, Ukrainians were ready to openly develop a body of national literature, institute a Ukrainian-language educational system, and form an independent state (the Ukrainian People's Republic, shortly joined by the West Ukrainian People's Republic). During this brief independent statehood the stature and use of Ukrainian greatly improved.

Speakers in the Russian Empire

In the Russian Empire Census of 1897 the following picture emerged, with Ukrainian being the second most spoken language of the Russian Empire. According to the Imperial census's terminology, the Russian language (Русскій) was subdivided into Ukrainian (Малорусскій, 'Little Russian'), what is known as Russian today (Великорусскій, 'Great Russian'), and Belarusian (Бѣлорусскій, 'White Russian').

The following table shows the distribution of settlement by native language ("по родному языку") in 1897 in Russian Empire governorates (guberniyas) that had more than 100,000 Ukrainian speakers.

Although in the rural regions of the Ukrainian provinces, 80% of the inhabitants said that Ukrainian was their native language in the Census of 1897 (for which the results are given above), in the urban regions only 32.5% of the population claimed Ukrainian as their native language. For example, in Odessa (then part of the Russian Empire), at the time the largest city in the territory of current Ukraine, only 5.6% of the population said Ukrainian was their native language. 

Until the 1920s the urban population in Ukraine grew faster than the number of Ukrainian speakers. This implies that there was a (relative) decline in the use of Ukrainian language. For example, in Kyiv, the number of people stating that Ukrainian was their native language declined from 30.3% in 1874 to 16.6% in 1917.

Soviet era

During the seven-decade-long Soviet era, the Ukrainian language held the formal position of the principal local language in the Ukrainian SSR. However, practice was often a different story: Ukrainian always had to compete with Russian, and the attitudes of the Soviet leadership towards Ukrainian varied from encouragement and tolerance to de facto banishment.

Officially, there was no state language in the Soviet Union until the very end when it was proclaimed in 1990 that Russian language was the all-Union state language and that the constituent republics had rights to declare additional state languages within their jurisdictions. Still it was implicitly understood in the hopes of minority nations that Ukrainian would be used in the Ukrainian SSR, Uzbek would be used in the Uzbek SSR, and so on. However, Russian was used in all parts of the Soviet Union and a special term, "a language of inter-ethnic communication", was coined to denote its status.

Soviet language policy in Ukraine may be divided into the following policy periods:

 Ukrainianization and tolerance (1921–1932)
 Persecution and Russification (1933–1957)
 Khrushchev thaw (1958–1962)
 The Shelest period: limited progress (1963–1972)
 The Shcherbytsky period: gradual suppression (1973–1989)
 Mikhail Gorbachev and perestroika (1990–1991)

Ukrainianization

Following the Russian Revolution, the Russian Empire was broken up. In different parts of the former empire, several nations, including Ukrainians, developed a renewed sense of national identity. In the chaotic post-revolutionary years the Ukrainian language gained some usage in government affairs. Initially, this trend continued under the Bolshevik government of the Soviet Union, which in a political struggle to retain its grip over the territory had to encourage the national movements of the former Russian Empire. While trying to ascertain and consolidate its power, the Bolshevik government was by far more concerned about many political oppositions connected to the pre-revolutionary order than about the national movements inside the former empire, where it could always find allies.

The widening use of Ukrainian further developed in the first years of Bolshevik rule into a policy called korenizatsiya. The government pursued a policy of Ukrainianization by lifting a ban on the Ukrainian language. That led to the introduction of an impressive education program which allowed Ukrainian-taught classes and raised the literacy of the Ukrainophone population. This policy was led by Education Commissar Mykola Skrypnyk and was directed to approximate the language to Russian. 

Newly generated academic efforts from the period of independence were co-opted by the Bolshevik government. The party and government apparatus was mostly Russian-speaking but were encouraged to learn the Ukrainian language. Simultaneously, the newly literate ethnic Ukrainians migrated to the cities, which became rapidly largely Ukrainianized – in both population and in education.

The policy even reached those regions of southern Russian SFSR where the ethnic Ukrainian population was significant, particularly the areas by the Don River and especially Kuban in the North Caucasus. Ukrainian language teachers, just graduated from expanded institutions of higher education in Soviet Ukraine, were dispatched to these regions to staff newly opened Ukrainian schools or to teach Ukrainian as a second language in Russian schools. A string of local Ukrainian-language publications were started and departments of Ukrainian studies were opened in colleges. Overall, these policies were implemented in thirty-five raions (administrative districts) in southern Russia.

Persecution and russification

Soviet policy towards the Ukrainian language changed abruptly in late 1932 and early 1933, with the termination of the policy of Ukrainianization.  In December 1932, the regional party cells received a telegram signed by V. Molotov and Stalin with an order to immediately reverse the Ukrainianization policies. The telegram condemned Ukrainianization as ill-considered and harmful and demanded to "immediately halt Ukrainianization in raions (districts), switch all Ukrainianized newspapers, books and publications into Russian and prepare by autumn of 1933 for the switching of schools and instruction into Russian".

Western and most contemporary Ukrainian historians emphasize that the cultural repression was applied earlier and more fiercely in Ukraine than in other parts of the Soviet Union, and were therefore anti-Ukrainian; others assert that Stalin's goal was the generic crushing of any dissent, rather than targeting the Ukrainians in particular.

Stalinist policies shifted to define Russian as the language of (inter-ethnic) communication. Although Ukrainian continued to be used (in print, education, radio and later television programs), it lost its primary place in advanced learning and republic-wide media. Ukrainian was demoted to a language of secondary importance, often associated with the rise in Ukrainian self-awareness and nationalism and often branded "politically incorrect". The new Soviet Constitution adopted in 1936, however, stipulated that teaching in schools should be conducted in native languages.

Major repression started in 1929–30, when a large group of Ukrainian intelligentsia was arrested and most were executed. In Ukrainian history, this group is often referred to as "Executed Renaissance" (Ukrainian: розстріляне відродження). "Ukrainian bourgeois nationalism" was declared  to be the primary problem in Ukraine. The terror peaked in 1933, four to five years before the Soviet-wide "Great Purge", which, for Ukraine, was a second blow. The vast majority of leading scholars and cultural leaders of Ukraine were liquidated, as were the "Ukrainianized" and "Ukrainianizing" portions of the Communist party. 

Soviet Ukraine's autonomy was completely destroyed by the late 1930s. In its place, the glorification of Russia as the first nation to throw off the capitalist yoke had begun, accompanied by the migration of Russian workers into parts of Ukraine which were undergoing industrialization and mandatory instruction of classic Russian language and literature. Ideologists warned of over-glorifying Ukraine's Cossack past, and supported the closing of Ukrainian cultural institutions and literary publications. The systematic assault upon Ukrainian identity in culture and education, combined with effects of an artificial famine (Holodomor) upon the peasantry—the backbone of the nation—dealt Ukrainian language and identity a crippling blow.

This sequence of policy change was repeated in Western Ukraine when it was incorporated into Soviet Ukraine. In 1939, and again in the late 1940s, a policy of Ukrainianization was implemented. By the early 1950s, Ukrainian was persecuted and a campaign of Russification began.

Khrushchev thaw

After the death of Stalin (1953), a general policy of relaxing the language policies of the past was implemented (1958 to 1963). The Khrushchev era which followed saw a policy of relatively lenient concessions to development of the languages at the local and republic level, though its results in Ukraine did not go nearly as far as those of the Soviet policy of Ukrainianization in the 1920s. Journals and encyclopedic publications advanced in the Ukrainian language during the Khrushchev era, as well as transfer of Crimea under Ukrainian SSR jurisdiction.

Yet, the 1958 school reform that allowed parents to choose the language of primary instruction for their children, unpopular among the circles of the national intelligentsia in parts of the USSR, meant that non-Russian languages would slowly give way to Russian in light of the pressures of survival and advancement. The gains of the past, already largely reversed by the Stalin era, were offset by the liberal attitude towards the requirement to study the local languages (the requirement to study Russian remained). 

Parents were usually free to choose the language of study of their children (except in few areas where attending the Ukrainian school might have required a long daily commute) and they often chose Russian, which reinforced the resulting Russification. In this sense, some analysts argue that it was not the "oppression" or "persecution", but rather the lack of protection against the expansion of Russian language that contributed to the relative decline of Ukrainian in the 1970s and 1980s. According to this view, it was inevitable that successful careers required a good command of Russian, while knowledge of Ukrainian was not vital, so it was common for Ukrainian parents to send their children to Russian-language schools, even though Ukrainian-language schools were usually available. 

While in the Russian-language schools within the republic, Ukrainian was supposed to be learned as a second language at comparable level, the instruction of other subjects was in Russian and, as a result, students had a greater command of Russian than Ukrainian on graduation. Additionally, in some areas of the republic, the attitude towards teaching and learning of Ukrainian in schools was relaxed and it was, sometimes, considered a subject of secondary importance and even a waiver from studying it was sometimes given under various, ever expanding, circumstances.

The complete suppression of all expressions of separatism or Ukrainian nationalism also contributed to lessening interest in Ukrainian. Some people who persistently used Ukrainian on a daily basis were often perceived as though they were expressing sympathy towards, or even being members of, the political opposition. This, combined with advantages given by Russian fluency and usage, made Russian the primary language of choice for many Ukrainians, while Ukrainian was more of a hobby. In any event, the mild liberalization in Ukraine and elsewhere was stifled by new suppression of freedoms at the end of the Khrushchev era (1963) when a policy of gradually creeping suppression of Ukrainian was re-instituted.

The next part of the Soviet Ukrainian language policy divides into two eras: first, the Shelest period (early 1960s to early 1970s), which was relatively liberal towards the development of the Ukrainian language. The second era, the policy of Shcherbytsky (early 1970s to early 1990s), was one of gradual suppression of the Ukrainian language.

Shelest period
The Communist Party leader from 1963 to 1972, Petro Shelest, pursued a policy of defending Ukraine's interests within the Soviet Union. He proudly promoted the beauty of the Ukrainian language and developed plans to expand the role of Ukrainian in higher education. He was removed, however, after only a brief tenure, for being too lenient on Ukrainian nationalism.

Shcherbytsky period
The new party boss from 1972 to 1989, Volodymyr Shcherbytsky, purged the local party, was fierce in suppressing dissent, and insisted Russian be spoken at all official functions, even at local levels. His policy of Russification was lessened only slightly after 1985.

Gorbachev and perebudova
The management of dissent by the local Ukrainian Communist Party was more fierce and thorough than in other parts of the Soviet Union. As a result, at the start of the Mikhail Gorbachev reforms perebudova and hlasnist’ (Ukrainian for perestroika and glasnost), Ukraine under Shcherbytsky was slower to liberalize than Russia itself.

Although Ukrainian still remained the native language for the majority in the nation on the eve of Ukrainian independence, a significant share of ethnic Ukrainians were russified. In Donetsk there were no Ukrainian language schools and in Kyiv only a quarter of children went to Ukrainian language schools.

The Russian language was the dominant vehicle, not just of government function, but of the media, commerce, and modernity itself. This was substantially less the case for western Ukraine, which escaped the artificial famine, Great Purge, and most of Stalinism. And this region became the center of a hearty, if only partial, renaissance of the Ukrainian language during independence.

Independence in the modern era

Since 1991, Ukrainian has been the official state language in Ukraine, and the state administration implemented government policies to broaden the use of Ukrainian. The educational system in Ukraine has been transformed over the first decade of independence from a system that is partly Ukrainian to one that is overwhelmingly so. The government has also mandated a progressively increased role for Ukrainian in the media and commerce. 

In some cases the abrupt changing of the language of instruction in institutions of secondary and higher education led to the charges of Ukrainianization, raised mostly by the Russian-speaking population. This transition, however, lacked most of the controversies that arose during the de-russification of the other former Soviet Republics.

With time, most residents, including ethnic Russians, people of mixed origin, and Russian-speaking Ukrainians, started to self-identify as Ukrainian nationals, even those who remained Russophone. The Russian language, however, still dominates the print media in most of Ukraine and private radio and TV broadcasting in the eastern, southern, and, to a lesser degree, central regions. The state-controlled broadcast media have become exclusively Ukrainian. There are few obstacles to the usage of Russian in commerce and it is still occasionally used in government affairs.

Late 20th-century Russian politicians like Alexander Lebed and Mikhail Yuryev still claimed that Ukrainian is a Russian dialect.

In the 2001 census, 67.5% of the country's population named Ukrainian as their native language (a 2.8% increase from 1989), while 29.6% named Russian (a 3.2% decrease). For many Ukrainians (of various ethnic origins), the term native language may not necessarily associate with the language they use more frequently. The overwhelming majority of ethnic Ukrainians consider the Ukrainian language native, including those who often speak Russian.

According to the official 2001 census data, 92.3% of Kyiv region population responded "Ukrainian" to the native language (ridna mova) census question, compared with 88.4% in 1989, and 7.2% responded "Russian". The part of other languages, specified like mother tongue was 0.5%. On the other hand, when the question "What language do you use in everyday life?" was asked in the sociological survey, the Kyivans' answers were distributed as follows: "mostly Russian": 52%, "both Russian and Ukrainian in equal measure": 32%, "mostly Ukrainian": 14%, "exclusively Ukrainian": 4.3%.

Ethnic minorities, such as Romanians, Tatars and Jews usually use Russian as their lingua franca. But there are tendencies within these minority groups to use Ukrainian. The Jewish writer Olexander Beyderman from the mainly Russian-speaking city of Odessa is now writing most of his dramas in Ukrainian. The emotional relationship regarding Ukrainian is changing in southern and eastern areas.

Opposition to expansion of Ukrainian-language teaching is a matter of contention in eastern regions closer to Russia – in May 2008, the Donetsk city council prohibited the creation of any new Ukrainian schools in the city in which 80% of them are Russian-language schools.

In 2019, the law "On supporting the functioning of the Ukrainian language as the State language" was approved by the Ukrainian parliament, formalizing rules governing the usage of Ukrainian and introducing penalties for violations. For its enforcement the office of Language ombudsman was introduced.

Literature and literary language

The literary Ukrainian language, which was preceded by Old East Slavic literature, may be subdivided into two stages: during the 12th to 18th centuries what in Ukraine is referred to as "Old Ukrainian", but elsewhere, and in contemporary sources, is known as the Ruthenian language, and from the end of the 18th century to the present what in Ukraine is known as "Modern Ukrainian", but elsewhere is known as just Ukrainian.

Influential literary figures in the development of modern Ukrainian literature include the philosopher Hryhorii Skovoroda, Ivan Kotlyarevsky, Mykola Kostomarov, Mykhailo Kotsiubynsky, Taras Shevchenko, Ivan Franko, and Lesia Ukrainka. The earliest literary work in the Ukrainian language was recorded in 1798 when Ivan Kotlyarevsky, a playwright from Poltava in southeastern Ukraine, published his epic poem, Eneyida, a burlesque in Ukrainian, based on Virgil's Aeneid. His book was published in vernacular Ukrainian in a satirical way to avoid being censored, and is the earliest known Ukrainian published book to survive through Imperial and, later, Soviet policies on the Ukrainian language.

Kotlyarevsky's work and that of another early writer using the Ukrainian vernacular language, Petro Artemovsky, used the southeastern dialect spoken in the Poltava, Kharkiv and southern Kyiven regions of the Russian Empire. This dialect would serve as the basis of the Ukrainian literary language when it was developed by Taras Shevchenko and Panteleimon Kulish in the mid 19th century. In order to raise its status from that of a dialect to that of a language, various elements from folklore and traditional styles were added to it.

The Ukrainian literary language developed further when the Russian state banned the use of the Ukrainian language, prompting many of its writers to move to the western Ukrainian region of Galicia which was under more liberal Austrian rule; after the 1860s the majority of Ukrainian literary works were published in Austrian Galicia.  During this period Galician influences were adopted in the Ukrainian literary language, particularly with respect to vocabulary involving law, government, technology, science, and administration.

Current usage

The use of the Ukrainian language is increasing after a long period of decline. Although there are almost fifty million ethnic Ukrainians worldwide, including 37.5 million in Ukraine in 2001 (77.8% of the total population at the time), the Ukrainian language is prevalent mainly in western and central Ukraine. In Kyiv, both Ukrainian and Russian are spoken, a notable shift from the recent past when the city was primarily Russian-speaking.

The shift is believed to be caused mainly by an influx of migrants from western regions of Ukraine but also by some Kyivans opting to use the language they speak at home more widely in public settings. Public signs and announcements in Kyiv are displayed in Ukrainian. In southern and eastern Ukraine, Russian is the prevalent language in most large and some small cities. According to the Ukrainian Census of 2001, 87.8% of people living in Ukraine were fluent in Ukrainian.

In August 2022, a survey in Ukraine by Rating Group found that 85% said they speak Ukrainian or Ukrainian and Russian at home, 51% only Ukrainian, an increase from 61% and 44% in February 2014. In the same survey, 76% considered Ukrainian their native language, up from 57% in July 2012, including 30% of Russian-speakers.

Popular culture

Music
Ukrainian has become popular in other countries through movies and songs performed in the Ukrainian language. The most popular Ukrainian rock bands, such as Okean Elzy, Vopli Vidopliassova, BoomBox perform regularly in tours across Europe, Israel, North America and especially Russia. In countries with significant Ukrainian populations, bands singing in the Ukrainian language sometimes reach top places on the charts, such as Enej (a band from Poland). Other notable Ukrainian-language bands are The Ukrainians from the United Kingdom, Klooch from Canada, Ukrainian Village Band from the United States, and the Kuban Cossack Choir from the Kuban region in Russia.

Cinema

The 2010s saw a revival of Ukrainian cinema. The top Ukrainian-language films (by IMDb rating) are:

Argots
Oleksa Horbach's 1951 study of argots analyzed historical primary sources (argots of professionals, thugs, prisoners, homeless, school children, etc.) paying special attention to etymological features of argots, word formation and borrowing patterns depending on the source-language (Church Slavonic, Russian, Czech, Polish, Romani, Greek, Romanian, Hungarian, German).

Dialects

Several modern dialects of Ukrainian exist
 Northern (Polissian) dialects:
 (3) Eastern Polissian is spoken in Chernihiv (excluding the southeastern districts), in the northern part of Sumy, and in the southeastern portion of the Kyiv Oblast as well as in the adjacent areas of Russia, which include the southwestern part of the Bryansk Oblast (the area around Starodub), as well as in some places in the Kursk, Voronezh and Belgorod Oblasts. No linguistic border can be defined. The vocabulary approaches Russian as the language approaches the Russian Federation. Both Ukrainian and Russian grammar sets can be applied to this dialect.
 (2) Central Polissian is spoken in the northwestern part of the Kyiv Oblast, in the northern part of Zhytomyr and the northeastern part of the Rivne Oblast.
 (1) West Polissian is spoken in the northern part of the Volyn Oblast, the northwestern part of the Rivne Oblast, and in the adjacent districts of the Brest Voblast in Belarus. The dialect spoken in Belarus uses Belarusian grammar and thus is considered by some to be a dialect of Belarusian.
 Southeastern dialects:
 (4) Middle Dnieprian is the basis of the Standard Literary Ukrainian. It is spoken in the central part of Ukraine, primarily in the southern and eastern part of the Kyiv Oblast. In addition, the dialects spoken in Cherkasy, Poltava, and Kyiv regions are considered to be close to "standard" Ukrainian.
 (5) Slobodan is spoken in Kharkiv, Sumy, Luhansk, and the northern part of Donetsk, as well as in the Voronezh and Belgorod regions of Russia. This dialect is formed from a gradual mixture of Russian and Ukrainian, with progressively more Russian in the northern and eastern parts of the region. Thus, there is no linguistic border between Russian and Ukrainian, and, thus, both grammar sets can be applied.
 A (6) Steppe dialect is spoken in southern and southeastern Ukraine. This dialect was originally the main language of the Zaporozhian Cossacks.
 A Kuban dialect related to or based on the Steppe dialect is often referred to as Balachka and is spoken by the Kuban Cossacks in the Kuban region in Russia by the descendants of the Zaporozhian Cossacks, who settled in that area in the late 18th century. It was formed from a gradual mixture of Russian into Ukrainian. This dialect features the use of some Russian vocabulary along with some Russian grammar. There are three main variants, which have been grouped together according to location.
 Southwestern dialects:
 (13) Boyko is spoken by the Boyko people on the northern side of the Carpathian Mountains in the Lviv and Ivano-Frankivsk Oblasts. It can also be heard across the border in the Subcarpathian Voivodeship of Poland.
 (12) Hutsul is spoken by the Hutsul people on the northern slopes of the Carpathian Mountains, in the extreme southern parts of the Ivano-Frankivsk Oblast, and in parts of the Chernivtsi and Transcarpathian Oblasts.
 Lemko is spoken by the Lemko people, whose homeland rests outside the borders of Ukraine in the Prešov Region of Slovakia along the southern side of the Carpathian Mountains, and in the southeast of modern Poland, along the northern sides of the Carpathians.
 (8) Podillian is spoken in the southern parts of the Vinnytsia and Khmelnytskyi Oblasts, in the northern part of the Odessa Oblast, and in the adjacent districts of the Cherkasy Oblast, the Kirovohrad Oblast, and the Mykolaiv Oblast.
 (7) Volynian is spoken in Rivne and Volyn, as well as in parts of Zhytomyr and Ternopil. It is also used in Chełm in Poland.
 (11) Pokuttia (Bukovinian) is spoken in the Chernivtsi Oblast of Ukraine. This dialect has some distinct vocabulary borrowed from Romanian.
 (9) Upper Dniestrian (Kresy) is considered to be the main Galician dialect, spoken in the Lviv, Ternopil, and Ivano-Frankivsk Oblasts. Its distinguishing characteristics are the influence of Polish and the German vocabulary, which is reminiscent of the Austro-Hungarian rule. Some of the distinct words used in this dialect can be found here.
 (10) Upper Sannian is spoken in the border area between Ukraine and Poland in the San river valley.
 The Rusyn language is considered by Ukrainian linguists to be also a dialect of Ukrainian:
 Dolinian Rusyn or Subcarpathian Rusyn is spoken in the Transcarpathian Oblast.
 Pannonian or Bačka Rusyn is spoken in northwestern Serbia and eastern Croatia. Rusin language of the Bačka dialect is one of the official languages of the Serbian Autonomous Province of Vojvodina.
 Pryashiv Rusyn is the Rusyn spoken in the Prešov (in Ukrainian: Pryashiv) region of Slovakia, as well as by some émigré communities, primarily in the United States of America.

Neighbouring countries

All the countries neighbouring Ukraine (except for Hungary) historically have regions with a sizable Ukrainian population and therefore Ukrainian language speakers. Ukrainian is an official minority language in Belarus, Romania, and Moldova.

Ukrainian diaspora
Ukrainian is also spoken by a large émigrée population, particularly in Canada (see Canadian Ukrainian), the United States, and several countries of South America like Brazil, Argentina, and Paraguay. The founders of this population primarily emigrated from Galicia, which used to be part of Austro-Hungary before World War I, and belonged to Poland between the World Wars. The language spoken by most of them is the Galician dialect of Ukrainian from the first half of the 20th century. Compared with modern Ukrainian, the vocabulary of Ukrainians outside Ukraine reflects less influence of Russian, but often contains many loanwords from the local language.

Most of the countries where it is spoken are ex-USSR, where many Ukrainians have migrated. Canada and the United States are also home to a large Ukrainian population. Broken up by country (to the nearest thousand):

 Russia 1,129,838 (according to the 2010 census);
 Canada 200,525 (67,665 spoken at home in 2001, 148,000 spoken as "mother tongue" in 2001)

Ukrainian is one of three official languages of the breakaway Moldovan republic of Transnistria.

Ukrainian is widely spoken within the 400,000-strong (in 1994) Ukrainian community in Brazil.

Language structure
 Cyrillic letters in this article are romanized using scientific transliteration.

Grammar

Ukrainian is a fusional, nominative–accusative, satellite-framed language. It exhibits T–V distinction, and is null-subject. The canonical word order of Ukrainian is SVO. Other word orders are common due to the free word order enabled by Ukrainian's inflectional system.

Nouns have one of 3 genders: masculine, feminine, neuter; nouns decline for:
 7 cases: nominative, accusative, genitive, dative, instrumental, locative, vocative;
 2 numbers: singular, plural.

Adjectives agree with nouns in gender, case, and number.

Verbs conjugate for:
 4 tenses: past, pluperfect, present, future;
 2 voices: active, mediopassive;
 3 persons: first, second, third;
 2 numbers: singular, plural.

Ukrainian verbs come in aspect pairs: perfective, and imperfective. Pairs are usually formed by a prepositional prefix and occasionally a root change. The past tense agrees with its subject in number and gender (but not person), having developed from the perfect participle.

The Old East Slavic and Russian o in syllables ending in a consonant, often correspond to a Ukrainian i, as in pod → pid (під, 'under'). Thus, in the declension of nouns, the o can re-appear when it is no longer located in a closed syllable, such as rik (рік, 'year') (nom): rotsi (loc) (році). Similarly, some words can have і in some cases when most of the cases have o, for example слово (nominative singular), слова (nominative plural) but слiв (genitive plural).

Ukrainian case endings are somewhat different from Old East Slavic, and the vocabulary includes a large overlay of Polish terminology. Russian na pervom etaže 'on the first floor' is in the locative (prepositional) case. The Ukrainian corresponding expression is na peršomu poversi (на першому поверсі). -omu is the standard locative (prepositional) ending, but variants in -im are common in dialect and poetry, and allowed by the standards bodies. The kh of Ukrainian poverkh (поверх) has mutated into s under the influence of the soft vowel i (k is similarly mutable into c in final positions).

Phonology

The Ukrainian language has six vowels, .

The letter  represents the voiced glottal fricative , often transliterated as Latin h. It is the voiced equivalent of English . Russian speakers from Ukraine often use the soft Ukrainian  in place of Russian , which comes from northern dialects of Old East Slavic. However,  appears almost exclusively in loan words, and is usually simply written . For example, loanwords from English on public signs usually use  for both English g and h.

Another phonetic divergence between the Ukrainian and Russian languages is the pronunciation of Cyrillic  v/w. While in standard Russian it represents , in many Ukrainian dialects it denotes  (following a vowel and preceding a consonant (cluster), either within a word or at a word boundary, it denotes the allophone , and like the off-glide in the English words "flow" and "cow", it forms a diphthong with the preceding vowel).

Unlike Russian and most other modern Slavic languages, Ukrainian does not have final devoicing.

Alphabet

Ukrainian is written in a version of Cyrillic, consisting of 33 letters, representing 38 phonemes; an apostrophe is also used.  Ukrainian orthography is based on the phonemic principle, with one letter generally corresponding to one phoneme, although there are a number of exceptions. The orthography also has cases where the semantic, historical, and morphological principles are applied.

The modern Ukrainian alphabet is the result of a number of proposed alphabetic reforms from the 19th and early 20th centuries, in Ukraine under the Russian Empire, in Austrian Galicia, and later in Soviet Ukraine. A unified Ukrainian alphabet (the Skrypnykivka, after Mykola Skrypnyk) was officially established at a 1927 international Orthographic Conference in Kharkiv, during the period of Ukrainization in Soviet Ukraine.  But the policy was reversed in the 1930s, and the Soviet Ukrainian orthography diverged from that used by the diaspora. The Ukrainian letter ge ґ was banned in the Soviet Union from 1933 until the period of Glasnost in 1990.

The letter щ represents two consonants . These iotated vowel letters and a special soft sign change a preceding consonant from hard to soft. An apostrophe is used to indicate the hardness of the sound in the cases when normally the vowel would change the consonant to soft; in other words, it functions like the yer in the Russian alphabet.

A consonant letter is doubled to indicate that the sound is doubled, or long.

The phonemes  and  do not have dedicated letters in the alphabet and are rendered with the digraphs дз and дж, respectively.  is equivalent to English ds in pods,  is equivalent to j in jump.

As in Russian, the acute accent may be used to denote vowel stress.

Transliteration

Orthography

Spelling search, which began in the late 18th century with the emergence of modern literary language, led to the emergence of several spelling options. In particular, there was the spelling system of Oleksii Pavlovskyi, the spelling version of "Mermaid of the Dniester" (1837), Kulishivka (P. Kulish's spelling system), Drahomanivka (produced in Kyiv in the 1870s by a group of cultural figures led by linguist P. Zhytetskyi, which included and M. Drahomanov), Zhelekhivka (system of Yevhen Zhelekhovskyi (1886), enshrined in the Russian Grammar by Stepan Smal-Stotskyi and Theodore Gartner 1893). 

Borys Hrinchenko used some corrections in the fundamental four-volume Dictionary of the Ukrainian Language (1907–1909). Most of the spelling rules (practically based on phonetics – "write as you hear") used in Hrinchenko's dictionary are still valid. Hrinchenko's work became an informal spelling and model for Ukrainian writers and publications from 1907 until the creation of the first official Ukrainian spelling in 1918.

On January 17, 1918, the Central Rada of Ukraine issued the "Main Rules of Ukrainian orthography", which, however, did not cover the entire scope of the language. On May 17, 1919, the Ukrainian Academy of Sciences approved the "Main Rules of Ukrainian Orthography", which became the basis for all subsequent revisions and amendments.

On July 23, 1925, the Council of People's Commissars of the USSR decided to organize a State Commission for the Organization of Ukrainian Spelling (State Spelling Commission). It included more than 20 academics from the USSR, who also expressed a desire to invite representatives of Western Ukraine: Stepan Smal-Stotskyi, Volodymyr Hnatiuk and Vasyl Simovych.

After almost a year of work in April 1926, the "Project of Ukrainian Spelling" was published to acquaint the general public with the new system. After several months of discussion and consideration of the project at the All-Ukrainian Spelling Conference (May 26 – June 6, 1927), the Ukrainian orthography of 1928 was adopted in accordance with the RNC resolution of September 6, 1928. It went down in history as "Kharkiv" or "Skrypnik orthography" – from the place of creation, or from the surname of the People's Commissar of Education Mykola Skrypnyk.

In 1929, Hryhorii Holoskevych published the Ukrainian Spelling Dictionary (about 40,000 words), agreed with the full spelling produced by the State Spelling Commission and approved by the People's Commissar for Education (September 6, 1928).

In 1933, a spelling commission headed by Andrii Khvylia branded the Ukrainian orthography of 1928 as "nationalist", immediately stopped publishing any dictionaries, and without any discussion, in a very short time (five months), created a new spelling that unified as never before the Ukrainian and Russian languages. The letter ґ was removed from the alphabet, and Ukrainian scientific terminology was revised and harmonized with Russian-Ukrainian dictionaries (the Institute of Ukrainian Scientific Language was abolished in 1930). This version of the spelling was approved by the resolution of the People's Commissar of Education of the USSR of September 5, 1933.

Some minor changes were made in the spelling of 1946 and 1959 (published the following year). It was connected with the document "The rules of Russian spelling and punctuation", published in 1956. From 1960 until 1990, the 1960 edition was the official standard.

After the beginning of "perestroika", the issue of improving Ukrainian spelling became relevant again: the editing of the spelling code was started by the Orthographic Commission at the LMM of the USSR Academy of Sciences. The project was also discussed in the newly established Ukrainian Language Society. T. Shevchenko (headed by Dmytro Pavlychko). The new version was approved on November 14, 1989, and published in 1990. The main achievements were the restoration of the letter ґ and the accusative case (in Soviet times it was optional and was called the accusative form).

Today, despite the existence of the official spelling of the Ukrainian language, it is not the only spelling standard in use. Even in Ukraine itself, many publishers and publications use other versions of the spelling, which either tend to "skrypnykivka", or else differ from the official rules of transmission of words of foreign origin.

On May 22, 2019, the Cabinet of Ministers of Ukraine approved a new version of the orthography prepared by the Ukrainian National Commission on Spelling. The new edition brought to life some features of orthography in 1928, which were part of the Ukrainian orthographic tradition. At the same time, the commission was guided by the understanding that the language practice of Ukrainians in the second half of the 20th to the beginning of the 21st century has already become part of the Ukrainian orthographic tradition.

Vocabulary
The Dictionary of the Ukrainian Language, in 11 volumes, contains 253,000 entries. Lexical card catalog of the Ukrainian Institute of Language Studies has 6 million cards. As mentioned at the top of the article, Ukrainian is most closely related lexically to Belarusian, and is also closer to Polish than to Russian (for example, можливість, mozhlyvist, "possibility", and Polish możliwość, but Russian возможность, vozmozhnost).

False cognates with Russian

The standard Ukrainian language which is based on the Kyiv–Poltava dialect has a plethora of false friends with the standard Russian language which is based on the Moscow dialect. Many people intentionally do or do not use them, causing their language shift into what is known as Surzhyk where the meaning of some words mimicking Russian could be understood out of context rather than their literal meaning in Ukrainian.

Classification

Ukrainian has varying degrees of mutual intelligibility with other Slavic languages. It is closely related to other East Slavic languages with high levels of mutual intelligibility.  Ukrainian is considered to be most closely related to Belarusian.

The separation of the East Slavic languages is considered to be relatively recent. In the 19th century, the question of whether the Ukrainian, Belarusian and Russian languages are dialects of a single language or three separate languages was actively discussed, with the debate affected by linguistic and political factors. The political situation (Ukraine and Belarus being mainly part of the Russian Empire at the time) and the historical existence of the medieval state of Kievan Rus', which occupied large parts of these three nations, led to the creation of the common classification known later as the East Slavic languages. The underlying theory of the grouping is their descent from a common ancestor. In modern times, Ukrainian, Russian, and Belarusian are usually listed by linguists as separate languages.

The Ukrainians were predominantly peasants and petits bourgeois. In 1897, 93% of Ukrainians were classified as peasants. As a result, the Ukrainian language was mostly vernacular and few earlier literary works from the period can be found. In the cities, Ukrainian coexisted with Church Slavonic—a literary language of religion that evolved from Old Church Slavonic—and later Polish and Russian, both languages which were more often used in formal writing and communication during that time.

Differences with other Slavic languages
The Ukrainian language has the following similarities and differences with other Slavic languages:

Like all Slavic languages with the exception of Russian, Belarusian, standard written Slovak and Slovene, the Ukrainian language has preserved the Common Slavic vocative case. When addressing one's sister (sestra) she is referred to as sestro. In the Russian language the vocative case has been almost entirely replaced by the nominative (except for a handful of vestigial forms, e.g. Bozhe "God!" and Gospodi "Lord!").
The Ukrainian language, in common with all Slavic languages other than Russian, Slovak and Slovene, has retained the Common Slavic second palatalization of the velars *k, *g and *x in front of the secondary vowel *ě of the dative and locative ending in the female declension, resulting in the final sequences -cě, -zě, and -sě. For example, ruka (hand) becomes ruci in Ukrainian. In Russian, the dative and locative of ruka is ruke.
The Ukrainian language, in common with Serbo-Croatian and Slovene, has developed the ending -mo for first-person plurals in verbs (khodymo for "we walk"). In all cases, it resulted from lengthening of the Common Slavic -mŭ.
The Ukrainian language, along with Russian and Belarusian, has changed the Common Slavic word-initial ye- into o, such as in the words ozero (lake) and odyn (one).
The Ukrainian language, in common with Czech, Slovak, Upper Sorbian, Belarusian and southern Russian dialects, has changed the Common Slavic "g" into an "h" sound (for example, noha – leg).
The Ukrainian language, in common with some northern Russian and Croatian dialects, has transformed the Common Slavic yě into i (for example, lis – forest).
The Ukrainian language, in common with Russian, Belarusian, Bulgarian, Serbo-Croatian, Macedonian, and Slovene, has simplified the Common Slavic tl and dl into l (for example, mela – she swept").
The Ukrainian language, in common with the most of Slavic ones, is a stress-timed language, in which syllables may last different amounts of time, but there is perceived to be a fairly constant amount of time (on average) between consecutive stressed syllables. 
The Ukrainian language, in common with all modern Slavic languages other than Bulgarian and Macedonian, does not use articles.
Other Slavic o in closed syllables, i.e., syllables ending in a consonant, in many cases corresponds to a Ukrainian i, as in pod → pid (під, 'under'). This also includes place names such as Lviv (Львів in Ukrainian), Lwów in Polish, and Львов (Lvov) in Russian.

Unlike all other Slavic languages, Ukrainian has a synthetic future (also termed inflectional future) tense which developed through the erosion and cliticization of the verb "to have" (or possibly "to take"): pysat-ymu (infinitive-future-1st sg.) I will write. Although the inflectional future (based on the verb 'to have') is characteristic of Romance languages, Ukrainian linguist A. Danylenko argues that Ukrainian differs from Romance in the choice of auxiliary, which should be interpreted as 'to take' and not 'to have.' He states that Late Common Slavic (LCS) had three verbs with the same Proto-Indo-European root : 
 a determined imperfective LCS *jęti: *jĭmǫ 'to take' (later superseded by numerous prefixed perfectives)
 an indetermined imperfective LCS *jĭmati: jemljǫ 'to take' (which would not take any prefixes)
 an imperfective LCS *jĭměti: *jĭmamĭ 'to hold, own, have'
The three verbs became conflated in East Slavic due to morphological overlap, in particular of *iměti "to have" and *jati "to take" as exemplified in the Middle Ukrainian homonymic imut’ from both iměti (< *jĭměti) and jati (< *jęti). Analogous grammaticalization of the type take ("to take", "to seize") > future is found in Chinese and Hungarian.

See also

 Chronology of Ukrainian language bans
 Languages of Ukraine
 Language policy in Ukraine
 Ukrainian Braille
 Ukrainian Sign Language

Notes

References

Citations

Sources 

 
 Lesyuk, Mykola "Різнотрактування історії української мови".
  (revised and updated edition)
 Nimchuk, Vasyl'. Періодизація як напрямок дослідження генези та історії української мови. Мовознавство. 1997.- Ч.6.-С.3–14; 1998.
 Magocsi, Paul Robert (1996). A History of Ukraine. Toronto: University of Toronto Press. .
 Litopys.kiev.ua
 . Ukrainian translation is partially available online.
 
 "What language is spoken in Ukraine", in Welcome to Ukraine, 2003, 1., wumag.kiev.ua
 All-Ukrainian population census 2001, ukrcensus.gov.ua
 Конституція України (Constitution of Ukraine), 1996, rada.kiev.ua  English translation (excerpts), rada.kiev.ua.
 1897 census, demoscope.ru

External links

 Dialects of Ukrainian Language / Narzecza Języka Ukraińskiego by Wł. Kuraszkiewicz  
 Hammond's Racial map of Europe, 1919 "National Alumni" 1920, vol.7, anesi.com
 Ethnographic map of Europe 1914, cla.calpoly.edu (archived 3 March 2008)
 Internet Encyclopedia of Ukraine: Ukrainian language
 The official Ukrainian Orthography (2012), published by the National Academy of Sciences of Ukraine
 101languages.net – Ukrainian 101

 
Ruthenian language
Languages of Ukraine
Subject–verb–object languages
Ukrainian studies
East Slavic languages
Languages written in Cyrillic script